"Baby You're Mine" is a song by Polish singer Basia from her second studio album London Warsaw New York released in 1990. The track was written and produced by Basia Trzetrzelewska and Danny White, and is a mid-tempo bossa nova-influenced composition. It served as the first single from London Warsaw New York and was a minor chart success.

Music video
The music video for the song was directed by Nick Morris and was intended to be a homage to Audrey Hepburn in Breakfast at Tiffany's. It pictures Basia wearing glamorous outfits, browsing a magazine on a sofa and performing dance routines surrounded by male dancers dressed in suits. The video was released on Basia's VHS/LaserDisc A New Day in 1990 and on a bonus DVD included in the special edition of her album It's That Girl Again in 2009.

Track listings

7" single/CD single
A. "Baby You're Mine" – 3:34
B. "Masquerade" – 4:32

12" single/CD single
A. "Baby You're Mine" (Berimbau Mix) – 5:38
B1. "Masquerade" – 4:32
B2. "Promises" (Justin Strauss US Remix) – 4:00

CD maxi single
 "Baby You're Mine" – 3:36
 "Masquerade" – 4:34
 "Promises" (Justin Strauss US Remix) – 4:02
 "Baby You're Mine" (Instrumental) – 3:36

CD maxi single
 "Baby You're Mine" – 3:36
 "Run for Cover" (Extended Remix) – 5:30
 "Copernicus" – 3:53
 "Baby You're Mine" (Street Version) – 3:29

Charts

Weekly charts

Year-end charts

References

External links
 The official Basia website

1990 singles
1990 songs
Basia songs
Bossa nova songs
Epic Records singles
Songs written by Danny White (musician)
Songs written by Basia